Central Park Theater is a historic theater building at 3531-39 W. Roosevelt Road in the Lawndale neighborhood of Chicago, Illinois. Built in 1917, the theater was the first in the Balaban and Katz chain. Chicago architectural firm Rapp and Rapp designed the Spanish Revival building; their design led them to become the main architects for Balaban and Katz, and later for Paramount Pictures. The firm's design featured two prominent towers on its front facade and was decorated with red brick and terra cotta. The theater was also the first in the world to include mechanical air conditioning, which featured prominently in its advertising during the summer. It provided entertainment to both Lawndale's Jewish community and the African-American community that replaced it in the 1950s, and it is one of the few remaining Lawndale business from the early twentieth century. The theatre was the inspiration for the well known Call of Duty Zombies map, Kino Der Toten.

In 1971, the theater was converted to the House of Prayer, Church of God in Christ; it has been used as a church ever since. The theater was added to the National Register of Historic Places on August 10, 2005.

References

Theatres on the National Register of Historic Places in Chicago
Spanish Revival architecture in Illinois
Theatres completed in 1917